Masashi Kameda   (born July 13, 1975) is a Japanese mixed martial artist. He competed in the Featherweight division.

Mixed martial arts record

|-
| Loss
| align=center| 2-6-3
| Motoyuki Takinishi
| Submission (kimura)
| Deep: clubDeep Osaka
| 
| align=center| 1
| align=center| 4:58
| Osaka, Japan
| 
|-
| Draw
| align=center| 2-5-3
| Mitsuhisa Sunabe
| Draw
| Pancrase: Brave 7
| 
| align=center| 2
| align=center| 5:00
| Osaka, Japan
| 
|-
| Win
| align=center| 2-5-2
| Mitsuhisa Sunabe
| DQ (head-butt)
| Pancrase: Brave 6
| 
| align=center| 1
| align=center| 3:52
| Tokyo, Japan
| 
|-
| Loss
| align=center| 1-5-2
| Tomoyuki Fukami
| KO (punch)
| Deep: 11th Impact
| 
| align=center| 2
| align=center| 3:46
| Osaka, Japan
| 
|-
| Loss
| align=center| 1-4-2
| Tomomi Iwama
| Decision (unanimous)
| Deep: 8th Impact
| 
| align=center| 3
| align=center| 5:00
| Tokyo, Japan
| 
|-
| Loss
| align=center| 1-3-2
| Hideki Kadowaki
| Submission (rear-naked choke)
| Shooto: Treasure Hunt 9
| 
| align=center| 1
| align=center| 2:23
| Setagaya, Tokyo, Japan
| 
|-
| Win
| align=center| 1-2-2
| Masanori Sugatani
| Submission (armbar)
| Shooto: Treasure Hunt 3
| 
| align=center| 1
| align=center| 4:34
| Kobe, Hyogo, Japan
| 
|-
| Loss
| align=center| 0-2-2
| Norifumi Yamamoto
| KO (punch)
| Shooto: To The Top 6
| 
| align=center| 1
| align=center| 4:17
| Tokyo, Japan
| 
|-
| Draw
| align=center| 0-1-2
| Hiroshi Umemura
| Draw
| Shooto: Gig West 1
| 
| align=center| 2
| align=center| 5:00
| Osaka, Japan
| 
|-
| Draw
| align=center| 0-1-1
| Yoshihiro Fujita
| Draw
| Shooto: R.E.A.D. 8
| 
| align=center| 2
| align=center| 5:00
| Osaka, Japan
| 
|-
| Loss
| align=center| 0-1
| Fumio Usami
| Decision (unanimous)
| Shooto: Shooter's Ambition
| 
| align=center| 2
| align=center| 5:00
| Setagaya, Tokyo, Japan
|

See also
List of male mixed martial artists

References

External links
 

1975 births
Japanese male mixed martial artists
Featherweight mixed martial artists
Living people